Ajooni is an Indian Hindi-language drama television series. The series stars Ayushi Khurana and Shoaib Ibrahim and premiered on 26 July 2022  on Star Bharat.

Plot

It is the story of a woman named Ajooni Vohra who will go to any lengths to fight for her rights. Rajveer Singh Bagga belongs to the Bagga family, known for their power in Punjab. The Baggas, headed by Rajveer's father, Ravindra Singh Bagga, are rooted deep in tradition and superstition. The Vohra family, however, are traditional but believe in progressive thinking and educating their daughters Ajooni and Meher. Rajveer Singh Bagga and Ajooni Vohra eventually fall in love despite seeming incompatible in the beginning.

The story is set in Haryalipur, where Ajooni and Avinash are to be engaged but then Ajooni accidentally meets Rajveer in the market and he falls for Ajooni - love at first sight, He starts stalking her and breaks her engagement with Avinash. After no option left, Ajooni agrees to marry Rajveer. After the marriage there are many dramas. Rajveer's sister, Dolly, plots against Ajooni as she does not like her. Ajooni supports Aman her sister-in-law. Harman and Dolly plots together. Avinash returns to Ajooni's life. Ajooni is not initially satisfied with her marriage, but over time she realizes Rajveer's genuine love for her.

Cast

Main
 Ayushi Khurana as Ajooni Vohra Bagga: engaged to Dr. Avinash but marries Rajveer Singh Bagga; Neeru and Subhash's daughter; Ravindra and Harman's daughter-in law; Meher and Bharat's sister; Harvendra and Dolly's sister-in law; Mrs. Vohra's granddaughter; Mrs. Bagga's grand-daughter-in-law.(2022-present)
 Shoaib Ibrahim as Rajveer Singh Bagga: Ravindra and Harman's son; Neeru and Subhash's son-in law; Harvendra and Dolly's brother; Mrs. Bagga's grandson; Ajooni's husband.(2022-present)

Recurring
 Drisha Kalyani as Meher Vohra, Ajooni's sister. 
 Pankaj Dheer as Ravindra Singh Bagga, Rajveer's father, Harman's husband. Ajooni's father-in law; Mrs Bagga's son. (2022-present)
 Shraddha Singh as Harman Ravindra Singh Bagga, Rajveer's mother; Ravindra's wife, Ajooni's mother-in law; Mrs Bagga's daughter-in-law (2022-present)
 Praveen Sirohi as Harvendra Singh Bagga (2022-present)
 Simran Khanna as Amanpreet Harvendra Singh Bagga (2022-present)
 Sonia Keswani as Dolly Singh Bagga
 Veena Kapoor as Mrs. Bagga: Ravindra's mother; Rajveer, Harvendra and Dolly's grandmother (2022-present)
 Jairoop Jeevan as Subhash Vohra (2022-present)
 Charul Bhavsar as Neeru Subhash Vohra (2022-present)
 Vedprakash Singh as Bharat Vohra (2022-present)
 Seema Sharma as Mrs. Vohra: Subhash and Bindu's mother; Ajooni, Meher and Bharat's grandmother (2022-present)
 Namrata Kapoor as Bindu Vohra (2022-present)
 Kamal Malik as Kamal, Bindu's husband (2022-present)
 Simarjeet Singh Nagra as Inspector Manjeet Singh Cheema (2022-present)
 Pallavi Sapra as Shikha: Harvendra's second wife (2022-present)
 Shourya Lathar
 Gaurav Bajpai as Dr. Avinash Khanna: Ajooni's former fiance (2022-present)
 Abhishek Khanna 
 Pooja Kshatriya
 Ajay Trehan as Mr. Narula
 Arun Bakshi as Tejendra Singh Bagga
 Shweta Gautam as Kaveri Tejendra Singh Bagga
 Robin Sohi as Shanky Singh Bagga
 Nimisha Vakharia

Filming
On 10 March 2023 around 4:30pm a massive fire broke out on the neighboring set of Ghum Hai Kisikey Pyaar Meiin turning the set into ashes and it was reported that the fire even reached the Ajooni set and another neighboring set of Teri Meri Doriyaann too.

See also
List of programs broadcast by Star Bharat

References

External links 
 Ajooni on Disney+ Hotstar
 

2022 Indian television series debuts
Hindi-language television shows
Indian drama television series
Indian television soap operas
Star Bharat original programming